Ollie Hancock (born 25 August 1987) is a British racing driver. Hancock is the son of historic racing driver Anthony Hancock, and the younger brother of sportscar racer Sam Hancock.

Career

Formula Ford
Hancock was born in Windsor, Berkshire, and began karting at the age of eight. He competed in five races before having to give up because of a shortage of funds. In the meantime, he rode motorcycles around the Hancock family home. He eventually moved into single-seaters in 2003, competing in the winter series of the Classic Formula Ford 2000 championship, campaigning a Van Diemen RF82. He would go on to win the championship.

Hancock moved up into the series full-time in 2004, and would finish up second overall, just a point behind the champion; achieving four pole positions, a win and ten podiums in the process. He did not acquire a sufficient budget for the 2005 racing season, but instead of sitting out the whole season, Hancock chose to improve his technical ability by taking the No. 2 mechanic role at the Formula Renault UK team Welch Motorsport, in the hope of returning to racing in 2006. He did return to the series in 2006 but again finished as runner-up, despite three wins, three poles and podiums in every race.

Formula Renault
Hancock moved up to the Formula Renault BARC Championship for 2007, competing for Mark Burdett Motorsport. He finished as the best rookie driver in the championship, in third overall, with two pole positions and a win all coming at Silverstone. He continued in the series in 2008, and dominated the championship, wrapping up the title with a round to spare. Five wins, three poles and six fastest laps allowed him to sit out the Silverstone finale, as he already had a 44-point lead over closest challenger Johannes Seidlitz. During the season, the British Racing Drivers' Club awarded him with a Rising Star invitation to that particular scheme.

Hancock planned to graduate the main Formula Renault UK championship for the season finale at Brands Hatch, but decided to focus on his 2009 campaign instead. He raced in the first twelve rounds of the championship, before encountering budgetary troubles. His best finish was fourth in the second race at Donington Park.

Formula Two
Hancock moved up to the FIA Formula Two Championship starting with the rounds at Oschersleben. He replaced the late Henry Surtees in the championship, but did not drive his No. 7 machine. He instead competed in car number 44. He finished 25th in the championship, with no points.

Racing record

Career summary

Complete FIA Formula Two Championship results
(key) (Races in bold indicate pole position) (Races in italics indicate fastest lap)

Complete 24 Hours of Le Mans results

References

External links 
 
 Career statistics from Driver Database

1987 births
Living people
English racing drivers
British Formula Renault 2.0 drivers
Formula Renault BARC drivers
FIA Formula Two Championship drivers
24 Hours of Daytona drivers
Rolex Sports Car Series drivers
British GT Championship drivers
Blancpain Endurance Series drivers
Asian Le Mans Series drivers
Sportspeople from Windsor, Berkshire
Britcar drivers
24H Series drivers
International GT Open drivers
24 Hours of Le Mans drivers
FIA World Endurance Championship drivers
European Le Mans Series drivers
Mark Burdett Motorsport drivers
Ecurie Ecosse drivers
Fortec Motorsport drivers
Le Mans Cup drivers
GT4 European Series drivers